"Original" is a song by English electronic duo Leftfield, released on 12" and CD on 13 March 1995 as the third single from their debut album, Leftism (1995). It features singer Toni Halliday on vocals and gave the group their first appearance on Top of the Pops, reaching number 18 on the UK Singles Chart. The beginning of the song is used often on the UK version of Big Brother.

Background
Toni Halliday told about "Original":

Critical reception
British magazine Music Weeks RM Dance Update called the song a "slow and low dub adventure". An editor, James Hamilton, described it as a "haunting dubby slow 0-86bpm tugger muttered and crooned by Curve's Toni Halliday".

Track listing
 12" "Original" - 6:22
 "Original" (Jam) - 5:27
 "Filter Fish" - 7:40
 "Original" (Drift) - 4:07

 CD "Original" (Radio Edit) - 4:10
 "Original" (Live Dub) - 7:37
 "Original" (Jam) - 5:27
 "Filter Fish" - 7:40

 Australian CD'
 "Original" (Radio Edit) - 4:10
 "Original" (Live Dub) - 7:37
 "Original" (Jam) - 5:27
 "Original" (Album Version) - 6:22
 "Filter Fish" - 7:40

Charts

References

1995 singles
1995 songs
Leftfield songs
PolyGram singles